Gaioz (Georgian: გაიოზ) is a given name, a variant of Gaius. It may refer to:

Gaioz Devdariani (1901–1938) Georgian revolutionary and Soviet politician
Gaioz Jejelava (1914–2005), Georgian and Soviet football player
Gaioz Nigalidze (born 1989), Georgian chess player.